Femail could refer to:

 a women's column in the Daily Mail
 a word used by FAST-NU on its new portal Flex to Discriminate Gender (Female).  
 a misspelling of the word "female"